Jean Forestier (born 7 October 1930) is a French former cyclist. He was a professional from 1953 to 1965. Forestier won the points classification in the 1957 Tour de France, and wore the yellow jersey for two days. He also won the 1955 Paris–Roubaix.

Major results
Source:

1953
 1st GP de Thizy
 9th Overall Circuit des Six Provinces
1st Stage 1
1954
 1st  Overall Tour de Romandie
 1st Stage 16 Tour de France
 1st GP de Thizy
1955
 1st Paris–Roubaix
 1st GP de Cannes
 1st Stage 20 Tour de France
 10th Overall Tour du Sud-Est
1st Stage 2
1956
 1st Tour of Flanders
 1st Stage 16 Tour de France
1957
 1st  Overall Tour de Romandie
1st Stages 2 & 3b
 1st  Overall Critérium National
 1st Stage 8 Critérium du Dauphiné Libéré
 4th Overall Tour de France
1st  Points classification
1958
 1st Stage 7a Critérium du Dauphiné Libéré
1961
 1st Grand Prix du Parisien
 1st Stage 8 Tour de France

References

Bibliography

External links

French male cyclists
French Tour de France stage winners
1930 births
Living people
Cyclists from Lyon